The Poster: an illustrated monthly chronicle, or simply The Poster, was a monthly magazine published in London from June 1898 to December 1900, dedicated to the then relatively new art of the pictorial poster. It was the first periodical devoted to the poster to be published in Britain. It was published by Ransom, Woestyn & Co.

Content 
The Poster contained sections on posters, advertising, and a segment dedicated to collectors and collecting. Illustrations were featured in both black and white and color.

References

Visual arts magazines published in the United Kingdom
Monthly magazines published in the United Kingdom
Defunct magazines published in the United Kingdom
Magazines published in London
Magazines established in 1898
Magazines disestablished in 1900